Springhurst is the name of several geographic locations:

Springhurst, Victoria, Australia
Springhurst, Louisville, Kentucky, United States of America